The Watchkeeper is a low rock fringed on the north side by sunken rocks, lying  north of Table Island in the South Shetland Islands. This feature was known to early sealers in the area as Flat Isle, but in recent years The Watchkeeper has overtaken the early name in usage. It was charted by DI personnel on the Discovery II in 1935.

References

Rock formations of Antarctica
Islands of the South Shetland Islands